England national under-19 football team, also known as England under-19s or England U19(s), represents England in association football at under-19 age level and is controlled by the Football Association, the governing body for football in England. Primarily, it competes to qualify for the annual UEFA European Under-19 Championship.

The squad are currently coached by Simon Rusk.

Competition history

UEFA European Under-19 Championship

2022 UEFA European Under-19 Championship

2022 UEFA European Under-19 Championship - Final tournament

Group stage 

The final tournament schedule was announced on 28 April 2022.

The group winners and runners-up advanced to the semi-finals and qualify for the 2023 FIFA U-20 World Cup.

Group B

Knockout stage

Bracket

FIFA U-20 World Cup play-off 

Winners qualified for the 2023 FIFA U-20 World Cup.

Semi-finals

Final

Players

Latest squad

The following players were named in the squad for qualifiers against Hungary, Iceland and Turkey, to be played between 22–28 March 2023.

Names in bold denote players who have been capped by England in a higher age group.

Recent call-ups
The following players have previously been called up to the England under-19 squad and remain eligible.

Honours
 UEFA European Under-19 Football Championship winners: (11) 1948, 1963, 1964, 1971, 1972, 1973, 1975, 1980, 1993, 2017, 2022

Notes

References

External links

Uefa Under-19 website

European national under-19 association football teams
19